Cranberry Lake (Nova Scotia) may refer to:

Annapolis County
Cranberry Lake 
Cranberry Lake

Cape Breton Regional Municipality
Cranberry Lake 
Cranberry Lake

Municipality of Clare
Cranberry Lake 
Cranberry Lake

Municipality of the District of Chester
Cranberry Lake

Colchester County
Cranberry Lake

Cumberland County
Cranberry Lake

Municipality of the District of Guysborough
Cranberry Lake 
Cranberry Lake 
Cranberry Lake 
Cranberry Lake

Halifax Regional Municipality
Cranberry Lake 
Cranberry Lake 
Cranberry Lake 
Cranberry Lake 
Cranberry Lake 
Cranberry Lake 
Cranberry Lake 
Cranberry Lake 
Cranberry Lake 
Cranberry Lake 
Cranberry Lake 
Cranberry Lake 
Cranberry Lake 
Cranberry Lakes

Inverness County
Cranberry Lake

Municipality of the District of Lunenburg
Cranberry Lake 
Cranberry Lake 
Cranberry Lake

Pictou County
Cranberry Lake 
Cranberry Lake

Region of Queens Municipality
Cranberry Lake

Richmond County
Cranberry Lake

Municipality of the District of Saint Mary's
Cranberry Lake 
Cranberry Lake 
Cranberry Lake 
Cranberry Lake 
Cranberry Lakes

Municipality of the District of Shelburne
Cranberry Lake

Municipality of the District of Yarmouth
Cranberry Lake

Rivers
Cranberry Lake Brook Shelburne at 
Cranberry Lake Brook Shelburne at

References
Geographical Names Board of Canada
Explore HRM
Nova Scotia Placenames

Lakes of Nova Scotia